Reynella is a metropolitan suburb of Adelaide, South Australia.

It is located 20 km south of the Central Business District of Adelaide in the north of the City of Onkaparinga. It is bordered to the east by Main South Road, to the south by Sherriffs Road, and to the north by Field River.

Reynella was divided into three smaller suburbs: Reynella, Old Reynella (the historical centre of the district) and Reynella East.

Reynella is in the South Australian districts of Mawson and Mitchell.

History

Reynella Post Office opened on 5 September 1856. A Reynella South office opened in 1963 and closed in 1969.

Transport information
Reynella is primary serviced by buses on the Adelaide Metro network.

It is serviced primarily by South Road, Sheriffs Road exits on the Southern Expressway and Young Street.

Landmarks
An unusual landmark in Reynella is what has become known colloquially as Junk Food Junction or Junk Food Corner. At a time when the fast food market was less saturated, the intersection of South Road, Adelaide and Pimpala Road had all four major fast food outlets:  McDonald's, Hungry Jack's, Pizza Hut and Kentucky Fried Chicken. Currently on this intersection there is McDonald's, KFC, Hungry Jacks, Fasta Pasta, Yiros King, Red Rock Noodle Bar, Domino's Pizza and a Caltex service station. The derelict site of the former Pizza Hut building has attracted some local controversy  for the amount of time it has taken to redevelop.

Shopping
Reynella is situated close to a small shopping precinct in Southgate Plaza. Westfield Marion and Centro Colonnades are the larger shopping complexes servicing the area.

Notable people
Notable people from or who lived in Reynella include:
 James Gilbert Woolcock, metallurgist, mining consultant, mining engineer

References

External links
City of Onkaparinga – Reynella History
View of Reynella around 1930, looking south.

Suburbs of Adelaide